Whitemarsh Hall was a large estate located on  of land in Wyndmoor, Pennsylvania, US, and owned by banking executive Edward T. Stotesbury and his wife, Eva. Designed by the Gilded Age architect Horace Trumbauer, it was built in 1921 and demolished in 1980. Before its destruction, the mansion was the third largest private residence in the United States. Today, it is regarded as one of the great losses in American architectural history.

Despite the name, Whitemarsh Hall was located in Springfield Township, not in Whitemarsh Township which borders Springfield to the west.

History

Construction and appointments 

Designed by the inspired autodidact Beaux-Arts architect Horace Trumbauer between 1916 and 1921, Whitemarsh Hall consisted of 6 stories (3 of which were partly or fully underground), 147 rooms, 45 bathrooms, and specialty rooms including a ballroom, gymnasium, movie theatre, and even a refrigerating plant. The neo-Georgian mansion had been a wedding present from Stotesbury to his second wife, Eva (the former Lucretia Cromwell, née Roberts). Completion was delayed by World War I; while the exterior was mostly completed by the end of the war, the interior decorations and furnishings, many of which had to come from war-ravaged Europe, took much longer to arrive.

The mansion was lavishly decorated with statues, paintings, and tapestry that Stotesbury had collected over the years, a collection later bequeathed to the Philadelphia Museum of Art. The French 18th-century furniture was purchased through Lord Duveen, who had guided Stotesbury in assembling the second of America's great collections of English portraits, and the floor was lined with exquisite Oriental rugs, also purchased under the guidance of Duveen.  Duveen also advised Stotesbury in purchases of French sculpture to decorate the huge mansion.

The gardens and landscaping were designed by the great urbanist and architect Jacques Gréber, whose designs in the grand manner of André Le Nôtre for the Philadelphian P.A.B. Widener at Lynnewood Hall had recommended him to Trumbauer and to Eva Stotesbury, who moved into a house next to the estate to follow the progress of construction at close hand.

Life at Whitemarsh Hall 

Smaller greenhouses were used for growing the many flowers needed to decorate the house for the lavish parties the Stotesburys liked to host. More than 70 gardeners worked at maintaining the grounds. The inside staff usually numbered forty, but many of them would follow the Stotesburys as they made their yearly pilgrimages to their Florida mansion, El Mirasol, for the winter and to Wingwood House, their mansion in Bar Harbor, Maine for the summer.

In addition to E. T., Eva and their servants, Whitemarsh Hall was also designed with Eva's two children in mind (adults by the time it opened), who were given their own rooms in the house. Her son Jimmy frequently resided within, as did (to a lesser extent) her daughter Louise.

For about nine years the mansion was the site of lavish balls and receptions.  The intensity of the party life dropped a bit after the Great Depression in 1929, and fell even more after 1933 when the Stotesburys were openly criticized for enjoying a life of splendor while most of the country suffered the hardships of the depression. The death of one of E. T. Stotesbury's own daughters in 1935 continued to dampen the Stotesburys' enthusiasm for festivities.

Whitemarsh Hall had often been called the "American Versailles", because of the level of attention to detail in the gardens and in the main building.

After Stotesbury 

Eva Stotesbury discovered, after the death of her husband in 1938, that she was relatively broke. Stotesbury had once declared that it cost him over a million dollars a year to maintain the house and the extensive property surrounding it. As a result of the Great Depression, the value of Whitemarsh Hall and its opulent furnishings was significantly lowered. Eva closed the mansion and moved to one of her other mansions, El Mirasol in Palm Beach, Florida.

During much of World War II the property was used for warehousing the bulk of New York's Metropolitan Museum of Art art treasures as it was feared that the Germans would bombard Manhattan from U-boats or warships. Eva Stotesbury had already put the property on the market after her husband's death, but there were no buyers. The property did not sell until 1943.

Transformation, then abandonment 

Whitemarsh Hall was finally sold for $167,000 to the Pennsalt Chemical Corporation (today part of Total Petrochemicals USA), which transformed the building into a research laboratory. Much of the grounds surrounding the mansion were sold for real estate development, which was quickly realized after the war ended. Pennsalt kept the mansion and its remaining grounds maintained and modernized, and constructed some new facilities on the property as well.

In 1963, Pennsalt (later renamed Pennwalt) built a new research center in the King of Prussia area, and moved out of Whitemarsh Hall, which was sold to a property investment group. Efforts to preserve or sell the mansion intact by this and successive owners were unsuccessful, and as the property became neglected and vandalized over the following years, demolition was decided upon. Disputes over the form of residential redevelopment to be undertaken (especially plans which envisioned luxury apartment towers) delayed demolition for a number of years.

The site today 

The mansion, which was larger than the White House in Washington, D.C. was demolished in 1980, and a development of modern townhouses called Stotesbury Estates was built on the property. The massive limestone pillars which were part of the mansion's front portico were left in situ as a tribute, along with the large belvedere at the back of the home. No homes occupy the footprint of the mansion itself, whose basements and foundations were simply backfilled. Small remnants of the huge gardens still exist today, including a fountain, several statues, stairs, and pieces of low stone fence and walls. The twin pillars of the estate's main gate, which was one mile (1.6 km) from the back of Whitemarsh Hall, are still standing on Douglas Road off Willow Grove Avenue, minus the steel gates. The gatehouse on Douglas Road, behind the main entrance pillars, also remains, converted to a private residence.

References

Houses in Montgomery County, Pennsylvania
Palaces in the United States
Demolished buildings and structures in Pennsylvania
Former houses in the United States
Houses completed in 1921
Buildings and structures demolished in 1980
1921 establishments in Pennsylvania
1980 disestablishments in Pennsylvania
1920s architecture in the United States
Georgian architecture in Pennsylvania
Neoclassical palaces
Neoclassical architecture in Pennsylvania
Horace Trumbauer buildings
Gilded Age mansions